The Fulfirst is a mountain of the Appenzell Alps, located north of Flums in the canton of St. Gallen. It lies in the Alvier group, between the Walensee and the Rhine Valley.

The Fulfirst has two summits: the Gross Fulfirst (2,384 m) and the Chli Fulfirst (2,372 m).

References

External links
Fulfirst on Hikr

Mountains of the Alps
Mountains of Switzerland
Mountains of the canton of St. Gallen
Appenzell Alps